Hyperbolic structure may refer to:
Hyperboloid structure
Hyperbolic set